The name Deathwing may refer to:

In comics and literature
 Deathwing (comics), an alternate-future incarnation of Dick Grayson/Nightwing, from the DC Universe.
 The Deathwing, part of an evil organisation in Douglas Hill's Last Legionary series of young-adult science fiction novels.

In games
In the Warhammer 40,000 fictional universe:
 Deathwing, the First Company of the Dark Angels chapter of the Space Marines.
 Deathwing (board game), the 1990 expansion of the Space Hulk board game
Deathwing, the first expansion set for the video game Space Hulk
 Space Hulk: Deathwing, a 2016 video game
Deathwing, the main antagonist in World of Warcraft: Cataclysm, and playable character in Heroes of the Storm